Svetla Vassileva (born 9 September 1965 in Dobrich) is a Bulgarian opera singer (soprano).

Svetla Vassileva appears on many of the world's leading operatic stages, including Teatro alla Scala, ROH Covent Garden, Wiener Staatsoper, Opéra National de Paris, San Francisco Opera, NCPA Beijing, New National Tokyo Theatre, Sydney Opera Theatre, New Israeli Opera in Tel Aviv, Washington Opera, Lyric Opera of Chicago, Arena di Verona, Accademia Nazionale di Santa Cecilia in Roma, Maggio Musicale Fiorentino in Florence, Teatro Regio di Parma, Teatro Regio di Torino, Grand Théâtre de Genève, Hamburger Staatsoper, Deutsche Oper BerlinPalacio de Bellas Artes in Mexico City, Seattle Opera, San Francisco, Los Angeles, Chile, Hong Kong, Shanghai, Valencia ecc.

Svetla Vassileva performed in a wide range of roles encompassing the repertoire of Puccini, Verdi, Mozart, Donizetti, Leoncavallo, Hindemith and Weill working with such conductors as Bruno Bartoletti, Riccardo Muti, Zubin Mehta, Lorin Maazel, George Pretre, Riccardo Chailly, Daniele Gatti, Vladimir Jurowski, Kent Nagano, Yutaka Sado, Jeffrey Tate, Yuri Temirkanov, Gustavo Dudamel.

A native of Bulgaria, Svetla Vassileva graduated in The Academy of Music in Sofia in voice and piano. After the university she moved to Italy. Actually she has two nationalities- Bulgarian and Italian.
Soon she achieved the biggest stages as Teatro alla Scala di Milano where she has sung for the inauguration after the restoration, Arena di Verona, ROH Covent Garden, Wiener Staatsoper, Opéra National de Paris etc. 

She has obtained a great success with Tosca at Palacio de Bellas Artes of Mexico city, Hyogo festival, conducted by Yutaka Sado, Hong Kong Opera, Manon Lescaut at Shanghai and New National Theatre Tokyo, La forza del destino at Sydney, Australia.
She has been acclaimed for her role in Mimì at La Scala of Milan, directed by Franco Zeffirelli and conducted by Gustavo Dudamel, Suor Angelica, directed by Ronconi, conducted by Chailly with whom she has sung again for the inauguration of the new theatre of the Festival Puccini in Torre del Lago. 
Svetla had a great experience, singing La Traviata under the direction of Marta Domingo and right after she started a big collaboration with the biggest tenor of our days, Plácido Domingo- concerts all around the world, I Pagliacci, conducted by Riccardo Muti and directed by Liliana Cavani, La Traviata and I Pagliacci at ROH Covent Garden. She has played this role also in Arena di Verona, Rome Opera, Festival Sant' Ander with Anton Guadagno, Grand Theatre de Geneve, Turin. 
She has been bowed as Traviata at Maggio Musicale in Florence and Tokyo, conducted by Zubin Mehta and directed by the Oscar, Cristina Comencini.
Svetla is loved by a long list of movie directors and artists like Franco Zeffirelli, Liliana Cavani, Lina Wertmüller, Cristina Comencini, Gabriele Lavia, Jean Reno.She has filmed I Pagliacci, opposite Roberto Alagna. 

For many years she has collaborated with Mo Bartoletti with whom she sang I Pagliacci at Chicago Lyric Opera and Genova, Giovanna d'Arco and Otello at Festival Verdi Parma, The sieben todsünden, directed by Hugo de Ana in Macerata, Cardillac, directed by Liliana Cavani in Genova. 
For her Traviata and Rusalka she has obtained the music critics award Abbiati. 
She sang Rusalka again in Turin, conducted by Noseda and directed by Carsen at the Opera Rome with Gullberg Jensen and Denis Krief. 
She obtained a wonderful reviews by the public and critics for her emotional interpretation of Madama Butterfly all around the world- Arena di Verona, directed by Zeffirelli, Sevilla, San Francisco, conducted by Luisotti, La Bastille-Paris, directed by Bob Wilson, Wiener Staatsoper, Teatro San Carlo in Naples, conducted by Pinchas Steinberg. 
One of her biggest recognitions she had was with Francesca da Rimini by Zandonai at Opera Bastille in Paris, directed by Giancarlo del Monaco. 
In Los Angeles she has sung Puccini's Turandot with Berio's last act, presented for the first time in USA.
Svetla sings also Russian repertoire, including Evgenij Onegin in Genova and Turin, Pique dame in Turin, conducted by Noseda, Iolanta at Santa Cecilia-Rome with Yuri Temirkanov. Later she recorded with the BBC and Gianandrea Noseda, Aleko, The Bells and Francesca da Rimini by Rachmaninov.

Her latest successes are in Beirut with Medea by Cherubini, La Fanciulla del West by Puccini in Copenhagen and Don Carlo in Genoa.
She has sung Requiem Verdi, conducted by Lorin Maazel at Festival Verdi- Parma, Jerusalem, Masada, Rossini's Stabat Mater at La Scala of Milan with Chailly, Mahler's Simphony n. 4 in Bologna with Gatti, Die vier letzten lieder by Strauss for the inauguration of the new airport in Mahon, Madeira. 
She made her debut in Verdi's Un ballo in maschera in Beijing, China, conducted by Lü Jia, with great success and presented Lo Schiavo by Gomes for the first time in Italy.
Svetla is frequently requested to do master classes all around the world. She has done a coaching for opera singers in Japan, Mexico City, France.
Svetla was testimonial of Chanel, for the Chelsea Flower Show, where the mind work of Tom Stuart- Smith and Karl Lagerfeld won the gold award.
She has sung also for Cartier special events and Ford benefit concerts by Mercedes “Stars and Cars”. Recently, Svetla sang for the Green house group's special event in Tokyo with the violinist Vasko Vassilev. Svetla Vassileva is a special guest at Andrea Bocelli's concerts and world tours in Europe and USA.  She is testimonial of Boothroyd and Stuart's Meridian audio.

Svetla Vassileva discography includes CD & DVD recordings:  Nozze istriane by Smareglia (live from Trieste; CD), Aleko and Francesca da Rimini by Rachmaninov with BBC Orchestra (CD), Francesca da Rimini by Zandonai (CD), Pagliacci (with Roberto Alagna; DVD), Pagliacci (with Plácido Domingo; DVD), Giovanna D’Arco (DVD), La Traviata (DVD), Falstaff (DVD), Ernani (DVD) with Montecarlo Opera.

Svetla Vassileva concert performances have included Mahler's Symphony no. 4 in Bologna with Daniele Gatti, Tchaikovsky's Iolanta at the Accademia Nazionale di Santa Cecilia in Roma with Yuri Temirkanov, Rossini's Stabat Mater conducted by Riccardo Chailly, Verdi's Messa da Requiem conducted by Lorin Maazel in Parma. 
The Bulgarian National Television produced a documentary on Svetla Vassileva's career, following her in several countries and theaters.

Career 
Her repertoire includes Desdemona in Otello, Leonora in La forza del destino, Violetta in La traviata, Alice Ford in Falstaff (Verdi), the title role in Madama Butterfly, La rondine, Suor Angelica and Manon Lescaut, Liu in Turandot (Puccini), the title role in Rusalka (Dvorak), Lisa in Pique Dame, Tatiana in Yevgeni Onegin (Tchaikovsky), the title role in Francesca da Rimini (Rachmaninov) and in Francesca da Rimini (Zandonai), Nedda in Pagliacci (Leoncavallo), Zemfira in Aleko (Rachmaninoff), and many others. 
She performs regularly at the Royal Opera House Covent Garden, the Vienna Staatsoper, La Scala in Milano as well as at the opera houses of Paris, San Francisco, Washington, Chicago, Rome, Florence, Turin, Geneva, Tokyo, Naples, Oslo, Monte Carlo, Venice and many others.
She has worked and continues to work with conductors, such as Bruno Bartoletti, Riccardo Chailly, Daniele Gatti, Vladimir Jurowski, Nicola Luisotti, Lorin Maazel, Zubin Mehta, Riccardo Muti, Kent Nagano, Gianandrea Noseda, Daniel Oren, George Pretre, Yutake Sado, Jeffrey Tate, Yuri Temirkanov.

Critical reception 
Laura Biggs of Musical Criticism wrote that Vassileva's performance as Cio-Cio San in Madama Butterfly "delivered a luxurious spinto sound. It lent her character absolute command. Hers was a voice to be reckoned with."

Pietro Acquafredda of "Il Giornale" wrote, "Svetla Vassileva has been one Violetta of great intensity and participation, round and intense voice, from the manual of the third act."

In 2010 Philip G. Hodge published an article, "Svetla Vassileva Superstars in a Superstar Production", in which he says, among others, "There is no question that Svetla Vassileva in her role as Butterfly is the star of this production", and "I don’t know or care how old Svetla Vassileva is nor how worldly and experienced she may be in real life – the person I saw on that stage was 15 years old, naïve, and totally in love with a skunk."

Recordings
Antonio Smareglia: Nozze istriane– conductor Tiziano Severini, Ian Storey (tenor), Katia Lytting (mezzo-soprano), Svetla Vassileva (soprano), Enzo Capuano (baritone), Giorgio Surjan (bass), Alberto Mastromarino (baritone); Teatro Verdi di Trieste Orchestra and Chorus. Live performance recording from the Teatro Lirico Giuseppe Verdi, December 1999. Label: Bongiovanni BGV 2265 king
Giuseppe Verdi: Giovanna d'Arco – conductor Bruno Bartoletti, Teatro Regio di Parma, 2008. DVD:C Major Cat:721208
Giuseppe Verdi: Falstaff – conductor Andrea Battistoni, Teatro Regio di Parma, 2011, Blu-ray, C Major 725304
Giuseppe Verdi: Traviata – conductor Yuri Temirkanov, Teatro Regio di Parma, 2011 Blu-ray, HD: C Major 72368
Giacomo Puccini: La Rondine – conductor Alberto Veronesi, 53rd Puccini Festival, Torre del Lago, 2007 NTSC DVD: 2.110266
Sergei Rachmaninoff: Francesca da Rimini - conductor Gianandrea Noseda, BBC Philharmonic, CD
Ruggero Leoncavallo: I Pagliacci - conductor Vjekoslav Sutej, Choir and Orchestra from Arena di Verona, 2006 DVD Deutsche Grammophon = DGG. 07342959

References

External links
 

1965 births
Living people
Musicians from Sofia
Bulgarian operatic sopranos
20th-century Bulgarian women opera singers
21st-century Bulgarian women opera singers
People from Dobrich